Succinyl-CoA:3-oxoacid CoA transferase  deficiency  is an inborn error of ketone body utilization. Succinyl-CoA:3-oxoacid CoA transferase catalyzes the transfer of coenzyme A from succinyl-coenzyme A to acetoacetate. It can be caused by mutation in the OXCT1 gene.

First described in 1972,there are 34 known people to have been reported in the medical literature with this inborn error of metabolism. They experience attacks of ketoacidosis during illness, and even when well may have elevated levels of ketone bodies in blood and urine (ketonemia and ketonuria, respectively). Not all people with SCOT deficiency have persistent ketonemia and ketonuria, particularly those with milder defects of enzyme activity.

References

Signs of scot disorder is lethargy, ketosis, hives, vomiting, and your feet turning purple. scot disorder starts to show signs of it in the first few years of life. If you think your child has scot disorder contact a geneticist and until you have an official diagnoses stay away form Aspartame as people with scot disorder are deadly allergic.

External links 

Inborn errors of metabolism